Vetriyur is a village in Sivaganga district in the Indian state of Tamil Nadu.

Geography
The mean elevation is 75 metres.

Demographics
As of the 2009 census, the total population was 1411. 45% of the population are men and 55% are woman.

Education
Bala Bharatha Primary School was established in 1946. Government Higher Secondary School is a co-educational school in Vetriyur that was established in 1977.

References

Cities and towns in Sivaganga district
Villages in Sivaganga district